Jimmie Hunt (born September 14, 1982) is an American professional basketball player who currently plays for Sportist Svoge of the National Basketball League (Bulgaria). He played college basketball for the Franklin Pierce.

Professional career
After going undrafted in the 2004 NBA draft, Hunt signed with Tajfun of the Telemach League for the 2005–2006 season.

In June 2007 signed a 3-year contract with Skyliners Frankfurt.

On 3 February 2015, Hunt has signed with BC Levski Sofia.

External links
 at scouting4u.com
 at basketball.eurobasket.com
 at basketball.realgm.com
 at basketball-reference.com
 at court-side.com
 at draftexpress.com

1982 births
Living people
American expatriate basketball people in Bulgaria
American expatriate basketball people in Germany
American expatriate basketball people in Italy
American expatriate basketball people in Poland
American expatriate basketball people in Slovenia
American men's basketball players
Basketball players from New York (state)
BC Yambol players
BC Levski Sofia players
BC Balkan Botevgrad players
Franklin Pierce Ravens men's basketball players
Point guards
Sportspeople from Utica, New York